Andrew Jacob Scott is a Canadian jazz guitarist and professor from Toronto.

Career
After playing French horn in middle school, Scott turned to guitar in high school. His introduction to jazz came from his mother's albums of Dave Brubeck, Junior Mance, and Oscar Peterson. He attended Humber College and was taught by Pat LaBarbera, Don Thompson, and Charles Tolliver. He received a master's degree from the New England Conservatory of Music and a doctorate from York University.

Career 
Scott has taught at Humber, York, and the University of Guelph. From 2007 to 2008, he was managing editor of Coda. He has worked with Harry Allen, Dan Block, Jim Clayton, Gene DiNovi, Bob James, Earl Klugh, Tony Monaco,  Bob Moses, Mike Murley, David Sanborn, Randy Sandke, and Grant Stewart.

Discography
With the Andrew Scott Quartet
 This One's for Barney (Sackville, 2004)
 Blue Mercer (Sackville, 2006)
 Nostalgia (Sackville, 2009)

With the Clayton/Scott Group
 The Clayton/Scott Group (CSG, 2002)
 So Nice (Boomtang/Koch, 2004)

With One Step Beyond
 One Step Beyond (Mo'Funk, 1996)
 One Step Beyond and J&B Scotch (J&B, 1998)
 Live in Montreal (OSB, 1998)

References

Year of birth missing (living people)
Living people
Canadian jazz guitarists
Canadian male guitarists
Journalists from Toronto
Musicians from Toronto
Canadian music journalists
Canadian male jazz musicians
Sackville Records artists
Humber College alumni
Academic staff of Humber College
York University alumni
Academic staff of York University
Academic staff of the University of Guelph